Nerses IV the Gracious (also Nerses Shnorhali, Nerses of Kla or Saint Nerses the Graceful; 1102 – 13 August 1173) was Catholicos of Armenia from 1166 to 1173. A more precise translation of his epithet Shnorhali is "filled with Grace". He received the appellation Shnorhali from his contemporaries because of the very irenic quality of his writing.

During his time as a bishop and, later, as Catholicos of the Armenian Church, Nerses worked to bring about reconciliation with the Eastern Orthodox Church, and convened a council with emissaries selected by the Byzantine Emperor himself to discuss how they might be able to reunite the two churches. The terms the emperor offered were, however, unacceptable to both Nerses and the Armenian Church, and the negotiations collapsed.

Nerses is remembered as a theologian, poet, writer and hymn composer. He has been called "the Fénelon of Armenia" for his efforts to draw the Armenian church out of isolation, and has been recognized as a saint by the Catholic Church, which holds his feast on August 13, and by the Armenian Apostolic Church, who celebrate him in mid-October on the Saturday of the Fourth Week of the Holy Cross.

Biography

Early life
Nerses was born in 1102 (or 1098 according to some authorities) into the noble Pahlavuni family, near present-day Aintab, Turkey. After the early death of his father, Nerses and his older brother Gregory were placed under the guardianship of their maternal granduncle, Gregory II the Martyrophile, who placed them in the monastery at Fhoughri. Later, Gregory's successor placed them under the monk Stepanos Manouk, a highly regarded scholar and theologian.

Nerses's family, the Pahlavuni, displayed a degree of nepotism, including in the area of religious vocations. Nerses himself was ordained to be a celibate priest at the age of 17, and was consecrated a bishop at the age of 35.

Bishop
In 1125, Nerses assisted his older brother, now Catholicos Gregory III of Cilicia, in moving the catholicate to Dzovk near Lake Kharput, on the property of their father, Prince Abirad. In 1138, amid political tensions, Gregory and Nerses started on a pilgrimage to Jerusalem, and, on the way, took part in a synod at Antioch to examine the behavior of Ralph of Domfront, Latin Patriarch of Antioch. On the conclusion of the synod, Gregory continued on to Jerusalem, sending Nerses back.

In 1165, hostilities broke out between Thoros II, Prince of Armenia and Oshin of Lampron, the two strongest Armenian princes of Cilicia. Gregory sent his brother Nerses out to mediate.

On his way to the mediation, Nerses stopped at Mamistra, where he met the Byzantine governor Alexios Axouch and discussed the strained relations between the Armenian and Greek churches since the Greek Orthodox declared the Armenian Church and the Jacobite Church heretics in 1140. Axouch was sufficiently impressed with this discussion to urge Nerses to write an exposition of the Armenian faith which Axouch could then forward to the emperor in Constantinople. Nerses did so, stressing in his letter that, as both the Armenian and Greek churches accepted the statements of the First Council of Ephesus, there was no clear reason for them not to be in agreement, making no polemical statements about the later Council of Chalcedon and its Confession.

On Nerses' return from his successful mediation efforts in the Armenian war, and the death of his brother Gregory shortly thereafter, Nerses was made Catholicos of the Armenian Church.

Catholicos
While in office, he moved the see of the Catholicos from Sis to Hromkla (Rumkale).

After the death of his brother Gregory, the letter Nerses wrote to the Byzantine emperor Manuel I Komnenos received a reply from the emperor. In the letter, the emperor invited the then-deceased Catholicos Gregory to come to Constantinople. Nerses wrote back to the emperor, informing him of Gregory's death and suggesting that an alternative might be for a discussion in which both the Greek and Armenian churches could present their positions. In 1171, the emperor sent a delegation led by Theorianus, a theologian from Constantinople, and John Atman, an Armenian member of the Orthodox Church and abbot of the monastery at Philippopolis. Although there had been early hope for active participation by the Jacobite Church as well, the patriarch of the Jacobite church, Michael the Syrian, chose to only send an observer with a Jacobite profession of faith to the meeting. The meeting ultimately concluded with an agreement which basically accepted the position of the Greek church. Nerses created a new profession of faith for his church written in a conciliatory tone to be taken back to Constantinople for review by that church. He sent with it a confidential message to the emperor in which he promised to make every effort to reconcile the Armenian and Orthodox churches.

In December of that year Theorianus and John Atman returned to Hromgla with letters from the emperor and the Orthodox Patriarch Michael III of Constantinople. The letter from the emperor encouraged Nerses to work toward the unity of the two churches, and expressed sympathy for the problems that were expected from the clergy of the Armenian church. The official statement from Constantinople included nine points which the Orthodox established saw as being at odds with the imperial church. These included points of doctrine regarding some of the church councils, including Chalcedon, liturgical questions including use of unleavened bread and undiluted wine in the Eucharist, and the disparities between the liturgical calendars of the two churches. The statement also specifically required that the emperor should be given the authority to make the appointments of any further Catholicoi of the Armenian church.

Nerses was surprised by the severity of several of the proposals, and raised objections to them. In response, the delegates from the emperor produced the confidential letters exchanged by Nerses and the emperor, which served to embarrass Nerses to the Armenians. The revelation served to harden the objections of the Armenian clergy to any attempts at reconciliation. Nerses wrote out a letter to Constantinople in which he thanked the emperor for his interest, and promised that, at the appropriate time, there would be a council in Armenia formed to take up his proposals. Nerses also suggested that the Greeks might consider the possibility that perhaps some of its own traditions could bear some attention and correction.

Nerses was by this time some 70 years old, and he made arrangements to turn the position of Catholicos to another. Following the tradition of his family, he chose between two relatives who had already achieved the position of bishop in the church. Nerses' own choice was for the younger of the two candidates, but the other one, Gregory, had support from the prince Mleh and ultimately took the position of Catholicos in 1173.

Works
In addition to the letters mentioned above, Nerses wrote a number of musical works, volumes of poetry, and theological works as well.

His major literary achievements include Vipasanoutyoun, a novel written in poetic form, and Voghb Yedesyo (Lamentation on Edessa), regarding the fall of Edessa.

Hisous Vordi is a reproduction of the Bible in poetic form, which also contains stories from church history and ends with the events of the End Times. It has been translated into English as Jesus Son.

Another of his works, Toukht Enthanrakan is an exhortation on pastoral theology and how Christians should behave. The work also includes information on the hierarchy of the Armenian Apostolic Church and of society, and matters of daily life in that era of Cilician Armenian history. It has been translated into English and modern Armenian.

A collection of his daily prayers, Twenty-four Hour Prayers, has been translated into 32 languages, and one prayer in particular, Havatov Khosdovaneem (I Confess with Faith) is currently available in 36 languages. Several of Nerses' poems have been adopted for use in the Armenian Hymnal and Divine Liturgy. His poetry has been said to emphasize "the imagery of fire and light in a manner at once redolent of Hesychasm and consonant with the Zoroastrian substrate of Armenian Christian culture."

One work of Nerses which has since been lost is a commentary on the Book of Genesis. In that work, he related the story he received from some Armenian monks who came to visit him during his time as Catholicos to tell him of how they were able to see the Garden of Eden from a distance. In one painting of the scene, the vegetation of the Garden appear as colored gemstones. Unfortunately, the angel with a sword appointed to guard the garden would not allow the monks to take one of the blossoms with them.

Canonization
In the Roman Catholic Church he is venerated as St. Nerses Glaietsi, Nerses Clayatsi alongside his nephew, St. Nerses of Lambron, both being considered champions of Church unity.

References

Bibliography 
 Nikoghos Tahmizian, Nerses Shnorhali – Composer and Musician (in Armenian), 1973, Armenian Academy of Sciences, Yerevan, Armenia.
 Aravot Louso  - "Առաւօտ Լուսոյ"
 Saint Nerses IV the Gracious “Shnorhali” - I Confess with Faith "ՀԱՎԱՏՈՎ ԽՈՍՏՈՎԱՆԻՄ” ( Havadov Khosdovanim )  - Saint Nerses IV the Gracious – Shnorhali (1102 – 1173) Ս. ՆԵՐՍԵՍ ՇՆՈՐՀԱԼԻ. Bibliography related to Saint Nerses Shnorhali and his most prominent prayer "I Confess With Faith”. A prayer translated in more than 38 languages - Ս. ՆԵՐՍԵՍ ՇՆՈՐՀԱԼԻ “ՀԱՎԱՏՈՎ ԽՈՍՏՈՎԱՆԻՄ”.

Nerses IV the Gracious
Nerses IV the Gracious
Pahlavuni family
Armenian saints
Armenian composers
Nerses IV the Gracious
12th-century Christian saints
Saints of the Armenian Apostolic Church
12th-century Oriental Orthodox archbishops
Armenian hymnwriters